Julio Alberto Zamora Ureña (born 11 March 1966 in Rosario, Argentina) is an Argentine football manager and former player, who played as a forward or midfielder.

As a footballer he played for the Argentina national team and a number of clubs in Argentina, Spain, Mexico and Bolivia.

Zamora started his career in 1985 with Newell's Old Boys. He also played for River Plate and Sevilla in the 1980s. In 1990 Zamora returned to Newell's where he was part of the squad that won the 1990-91 and Clausura 1992 championships. In 1993 Zamora was part of the victorious Argentina squad for the Copa América 1993. Between 1993 and 1996 Zamora played in Mexico with Cruz Azul, he returned to Argentina in 1997, once again to Newell's Old Boys.

Towards the end of his career he played for Wilstermann in Bolivia. His last professional club was  Club Atlético Platense of the Argentine 2nd division. He retired in 2000.

Honours

Club
 Newell's Old Boys
Primera División Argentina: 1990–91, Clausura 1992

 Cruz Azul
Copa Mexico: 1996
CONCACAF Champions' Cup: 1996

International
 Argentina
Copa América: 1993

External links

Argentine footballers
Argentina international footballers
Association football forwards
Newell's Old Boys footballers
Club Atlético River Plate footballers
Sevilla FC players
Liga MX players
Argentine Primera División players
Argentine expatriate footballers
Cruz Azul footballers
Expatriate footballers in Mexico
C.D. Jorge Wilstermann players
Expatriate footballers in Bolivia
Club Atlético Platense footballers
1993 Copa América players
Argentine expatriate sportspeople in Bolivia
Footballers from Rosario, Santa Fe
1966 births
Living people
Argentine football managers
FBC Melgar managers
Peruvian Primera División managers
Copa América-winning players
Club Aurora managers
Nacional Potosí managers
Deportivo Binacional FC managers
Club San José managers
Club Real Potosí managers
C.D. Olmedo managers